Mercado Modelo (Spanish and Portuguese for "Model Market") may refer to:

 Mercado Modelo (Montevideo), Uruguay
 Mercado Modelo (Salvador), Brazil